World Tomorrow, or The Julian Assange Show, is a 2012 television program series of 26-minute political interviews hosted by WikiLeaks founder and editor Julian Assange. Twelve episodes were shot prior to the program's premiere.  It first aired on 17 April 2012, the 500th day of the "financial blockade" of WikiLeaks, on RT.

List of episodes

Production 
The show is produced by Quick Roll Productions, which was established by Julian Assange with the assistance of Dartmouth Films. It is distributed by Journeyman Pictures and broadcast internationally in English, Arabic, and Spanish by RT and Italian newspaper L'espresso, who both make the program available online. The theme for the show was composed by M.I.A.

Margarita Simonyan, editor-in-chief of RT, told the daily Moskovskii Komsomolets that Assange will resume making shows and allowing them to be broadcast on Russian television once his legal troubles are over.

Reception
In his The New York Times blog, Robert Mackey called RT "a strange partner" for Assange while Robert Colvile inveighed Assange's show by writing, "After Wikileaks – and its mission to change the world – collapsed under the weight of its leader’s ego, Assange started hosting a TV show sponsored by that noted friend of freedom, Vladimir Putin." In an article for The Guardian, Luke Harding  described the show as proof that Assange was a "useful idiot". Another article in The Guardian by Miriam Elder said that it was doubtful Russian "revolutionaries" will make the show's guestlist and reported a tweet by Alexander Lebedev lambasting Assange, tweeting that it was, "Hard to imagine [a] more miserable final[e] for [a] 'world order challenger' than employee of state-controlled 'Russia Today'."

Glenn Greenwald of Salon magazine praised the show and condemned the detractors writing for The New York Times and The Guardian. Assange himself wrote a column published as a WikiLeaks press release that parodied some of the criticism.

At the end of the season, Tracy Quan wrote an article called "I Love the Julian Assange Show!", describing the show as "addictive, lively, wide-ranging, and informative".

References

External links 
  official website (description and transcript of each episode)
 

2012 Russian television series debuts
2010s Russian television series
Julian Assange
RT (TV network) original programming
Russian television talk shows